Gabriela Sabatini and Brenda Schultz-McCarthy were the defending champions but did not compete that year.

Lisa Raymond and Rennae Stubbs won in the final 6–1, 6–1 against Angela Lettiere and Nana Miyagi.

Seeds
Champion seeds are indicated in bold text while text in italics indicates the round in which those seeds were eliminated.

 Meredith McGrath /  Jana Novotná (quarterfinals)
 Lindsay Davenport /  Mary Joe Fernández (quarterfinals)
 Nicole Arendt /  Lori McNeil (semifinals)
 Martina Hingis /  Linda Wild (quarterfinals)

Draw

External links
 1996 Ameritech Cup Doubles Draw

Ameritech Cup
1996 WTA Tour